Mom's Command (March 14, 1982 – February 3, 2007) was a multiple Grade I-winning American Thoroughbred race horse. In a two-year career, she won eleven of her sixteen races.  In 1985, she was voted American Champion Three-Year-Old Filly at the Eclipse Awards.

Background
Her breeder and owner was Peter D. Fuller of Runnymede Farm in North Hampton, New Hampshire, the son of former Massachusetts Governor Alvan T. Fuller. Fuller (who had once been a champion boxer and wrestler at Harvard University) bred his mare Star Mommy to the stallion Top Command (by Bold Ruler), hoping to produce a foal who combined speed and stamina.  The result was Mom's Command.

The bright chestnut filly was trained by New Jersey-born Ned Allard, whose father was a professor at New York’s Juilliard School of Music.  She was ridden in all but two of her races by Peter Fuller’s daughter, Abigail Fuller. At 26 years of age, she became the first woman jockey to ride the winner of a "Triple Tiara" event, and also the first to sweep the three races.

Racing career

1984: two-year-old season
Mom's Command won her first race, the ungraded Faneuil Miss Stakes, in July 1984 at New Hampshire’s Rockingham Park after going off at odds of 44-1.  After winning the Faneuil Miss, she appeared in the Grade II Astarita at Belmont Park; she broke from the starting gate five lengths behind the field and came back from last place to win.  Following the Astarita, she took the Grade I Selima Stakes by 5½ lengths.

Three of her seven starts as a two-year-old had Daily Racing Form "trouble lines" (race notes) – "steadied at start"; "poor start" and "off poorly". However, she won four of those races.

1985: three-year-old season
As a 3-year-old, Mom's Command dominated her competition, winning seven of her nine starts. In the Test Stakes, she finished second to another star filly, Lady's Secret, by two lengths. She won the stakes which constitute the Filly Triple Crown – the Acorn, the Mother Goose and the Coaching Club American Oaks (the latter by 2½ lengths). She preceded her Triple Crown victories with a 19-length win in the Flirtation Stakes at Pimlico Race Course and a second to the speedy Clocks Secret in the Goldfinch at Garden State Park. In the Goldfinch, she raced on a "dead rail" (deep mud on the rail) for nearly the entire distance. She returned to take the Cherry Blossom Handicap at Garden State and the Comely Stakes at Belmont Park.  In the Comely, Clocks Secret finished six lengths behind Mom's Command; 11 lengths back was Lady’s Secret.

Following her Triple Crown, Mom's Command then won the Grade I Alabama Stakes, leading all the way and defeating Fran's Valentine by four lengths. Fran's Valentine was the betting favorite, since she had won six of seven starts and her jockey was the well-known Chris McCarron; however, the Daily Racing Form notes that Mom's Command was "ridden out" (winning easily, without additional urging). In 1985, Mom's Command won the Eclipse Award as American Champion Three-Year-Old Filly.

She was the sixth horse to win the Filly Triple Crown.  Her five predecessors were Dark Mirage (1968), Shuvee (1969), Chris Evert (1974), Ruffian (1975) and Davona Dale (1979).  Beside Mom’s Command, only Shuvee also won the Alabama Stakes (which replaced the Acorn in the "Triple Tiara", from 2003 to 2006).  The Alabama, run at Saratoga, is the filly counterpart of the Grade I Travers Stakes. Every filly who ever beat Mom's Command was then defeated by Mom's Command (including Lady's Secret, noted above).  She won at distances ranging from five furlongs to 1½ miles. Hall of Fame jockey Angel Cordero Jr. once said to Peter Fuller: "I love Mom's Command and I love your daughter Abby, but I'm sick of looking at both of their rear ends."

Retirement

Mom's Command was retired on September 29, 1985, after she injured her ankle while training for the Rare Perfume Stakes at Belmont Park. Her career earnings were $902,972. She foaled one stakes winner, Jonesboro. On February 3, 2007, Mom's Command was euthanized at Runnymede Farm at age 25, due to the infirmities of old age; she is buried on the farm.

Honors
Mom's Command was inducted into the racing wing of the New England Sports Hall of Fame in the summer of 2006.  She was elected to the National Museum of Racing and Hall of Fame in 2007.

Pedigree

See also
 Dancer's Image, another horse owned by Peter D. Fuller

References

Further reading

External links
 Mom’s Command’s pedigree
 Mom’s Command in the Hall of Fame
 Saratoga 150 Feature: Mom's Command via YouTube
 Abby Fuller remembers Mom's Command via YouTube

1982 racehorse births
2007 racehorse deaths
Thoroughbred family 5-j
Racehorses bred in Kentucky
Racehorses trained in the United States
Triple Crown of Thoroughbred Racing winners
Eclipse Award winners
United States Thoroughbred Racing Hall of Fame inductees